Micropublishing is used in three senses: 
Publishing on microforms as pioneered by Eugene Power.
The book publishing industry sometimes uses this term in discussing publishing companies below a certain revenue level.
It is also used to describe the use of efficient publishing and distribution techniques to publish a work intended for a specific micromarket.  Typically, these works are not considered by larger publishers because of their low economy of scale and mass appeal and the difficulties that would arise in their marketing.
In the digital sense micro-publishing is the posting of short articles, posts, reviews, thought pieces etc. to a public website. Micro-publishing is usually done with the express purpose of sharing the content via search engines, social media, email or other forms of digital content distribution. 

The remainder of this article is about the second use of the term.

To make micropublishing more economical, the works are often printed using POD (print on demand) printing techniques. Those new to the industry often use companies called "POD publishers", while those who have more experience or who are more profit-focused tend to skip these middlemen.  POD printing reduces the required up-front investment in book publishing, allowing many more individuals and companies to enter the marketplace, and allowing niche markets to be served as never before. The ebook market is taking this one step further.

History
Before the emergence of the internet, micropublishing was considered a "microtrend" that would not play much of a role in the publishing world, because costs per copy were too high.  The internet has changed this by providing authors and micropublishers with an affordable medium through which to publish and distribute their works.

The Internet is also evolving how the works from traditional publishing, self-publishing and micro-publishing are distributed.  The long imagined dream of digital distribution for published works is quickly becoming a reality.  For micro-publications, digital distribution may enable greater numbers of authors and potential authors to enter the publishing industry to access readers who prefer to receive and/or consume content in digital form.

Present
Presently, digital versions of all publications are subject to copyright piracy since technology makes it easy to replicate perfect copies of digital materials.  This is especially true when such materials are displayed on the Web where scraper sites routinely infringe the works of others.

The Digital Millennium Copyright Act (DMCA) lets copyright holders protect themselves by sending online service providers "take-down notices."  Digital copyright holders, however, must first spot unauthorized copies of their works and then find the original infringer, a task made challenging by the vastness of the Internet.

eReaders
eReaders from companies such as Apple, Amazon, Sony, and Barnes and Noble may help both traditional publishers and micro-publishers solve the infringement problem and protect their works in the digital form.  The use of intellectual property conventions (not just copyright practices) to protect digital works is accelerating.

Distribution
Digital micropublishing sites like Scribd and Docstoc enable micro-publishers to easily distribute their digital works using intellectual property licenses.  Licensing micro-publications simplifies protecting and tracking those works which are distributed digitally, an approached used for many years by software producers, and in the last decade by MP3 music distributors.

Micro-publishers and authors who use intellectual property licensing sites are not limited to a specific medium (like eReaders) to distribute their works.  This flexibility may allow micropublishing to significantly expand readership while protecting copyrights.

Notes

References 
Idris, Kamil (2003). Intellectual Property: A Power Tool for Economic Growth, World Intellectual Property Organization.
Willinsky, John (2006). The Access Principle: The Case for Open Access to Research and Scholarship, Massachusetts Institute of Technology.

Publishing
Ebook suppliers